|}

The Queen of Scots Stakes is a Listed flat horse race in Great Britain open to mares and fillies aged three years or older.
It is run at Musselburgh over a distance of 7 furlongs and 33 yards (1,438 metres), and it is scheduled to take place each year in June. The race was introduced as a new Listed race in 2017 and the inaugural running was sponsored by Edinburgh Gin. From 2019 to 2021 it was sponsored by Stobo Castle.

From 2017 to 2021 the was race was titled the Maggie Dickson Stakes in honour of Maggie Dickson (aka Half-Hangit Maggie), who was born in Musselburgh around 1702 and who became a local celebrity for surviving her execution.

Winners

See also 
 Horse racing in Scotland
 List of British flat horse races

References 

Racing Post:

Flat races in Great Britain
Musselburgh Racecourse
Mile category horse races for fillies and mares
Recurring sporting events established in 2017
2017 establishments in Scotland